The Health Protection Agency (HPA), along with its subdivision, the National Collection of Type Cultures (NCTC) Culture Collections, is a non-profit organization located in the UK. HPA plays a role for protecting UK public health. More detailed information can be obtained from HPA home page.

References

External links 
HPA culture collection
NCTC home page

Biological research institutes in the United Kingdom
Culture collections
Microbiology organizations
Public Health England